Arabinoxylan is a hemicellulose found in both the primary and secondary cell walls of plants, including woods and cereal grains, consisting of copolymers of two pentose sugars: arabinose and xylose.

Structure
Arabinoxylan chains contain a large number of 1,4-linked xylose units. Their backbones are composed of β-D-xylopyranosyl units substituted with single α-L-arabinofuranosyl units. Many xylose units are substituted with 2, 3 or 2,3-linked arabinose residues.

Functions
Arabinoxylans chiefly serve a structural role in the plant cells. They are also the reservoirs of large amounts of ferulic acid and other phenolic acids which are covalently linked to them. Phenolic acids may also be involved in defense including protection against fungal pathogens.

Arabinoxylans are one of the main components of soluble and insoluble dietary fibers which are shown to exert various health benefits. In addition, arabinoxylans, owing to their bound phenolic acids, are shown to have antioxidant activity. Their ion exchange capacity and viscosity are also partly responsible for their beneficial metabolic effects.

References

Polysaccharides
Copolymers